Vasum haitensis is an extinct species of medium to large sea snail, a marine gastropod mollusk in the family Turbinellidae.

Description
The height of the shell: 60.0 mm, its diameter 37.0 mm.

Distribution
Fossils of this marine species have been found in Pliocene strata of the Dominican Republic; also in Miocene strata of  Brazil, Colombia, Mexico, Florida, USA and Venezuela (age range: 20.43 to 2.588 Ma)

References

 C. J. Maury. 1917. Santo Domingo type sections and fossils. Bulletins of American Paleontology 5(30):1-43
/ E. H. Vokes. 1970. Notes on the fauna of the Chipola Formation - III. Two new species of Vasum (Mollusca: Gastropoda), with comments on Vasum haitense (Sowerby). Tulane Studies in Geology and Paleontology 8(2):88-92
E. H. Vokes. 1998. Neogene Paleontology in the Northern Dominican Republic 18. The Superfamily Volutacea (in part) (Mollusca: Gastropoda). Bulletins of American Paleontology 113(354):1-54
 M.C. Perrilliat. 1987. Gasteropodos y un cefalopodo de la formacion Ferrotepec (Mioceno Medio) de Michoacan. Paleontologia Mexicana 52:1-58
 B. Landau and C. Marques da Silva. 2010. Early Pliocene gastropods of Cubagua, Venezuela: Taxonomy, palaeobiogeography and ecostratigraphy. Palaeontos 19:1-221

External links
 

haitensis
Gastropods described in 1850